A Sleep disorder specialist (SDS) is a Registered Respiratory Therapist (RRT-SDS) that has successfully passed the certification examination NBRC-SDS.  The respiratory therapist may also be a Certified Respiratory Therapist (CRT-SDS) under certain conditions.  The sleep disorder specialist scores and performs polysomnography and also assists in diagnosing and preparing a treatment plan for the condition.  Some of the conditions the sleep disorder specialist helps evaluate and treat are; insomnia, sleep apnea, restless legs syndrome, and narcolepsy.

See also
Respiratory therapy
Certified Respiratory Therapist
American Association of Sleep Technologists

References

Allied health professions
Respiratory therapy
Pulmonary function testing
Sleep medicine
Health care occupations
Medical credentials
Respiratory therapist credentials and certifications